Sandi is a village in Rõuge Parish, Võru County in southeastern Estonia. Between 1991–2017 (until the administrative reform of Estonian municipalities) the village was located in Misso Parish. It is located about 7 km north of Misso, the administrative centre of the municipality and about 8 km southwest of Vastseliina. As of 2011 Census, the village's population was 3.

There are 5 farmsteads in the village: Kopli, Mäe, Siusaare, Saare and Sandi.

References

Villages in Võru County